"Ma vie" is a song by French singer Dadju from his album Poison ou Antidote. It was released on 11 October 2019.

Charts

Weekly charts

Year-end charts

Certifications

References 

2019 singles
2019 songs
Dadju songs
French-language songs